On January 7, 1952, Philadelphia's current city charter took effect. The city council created under that charter consists of seventeen members. Ten are elected from equal-sized districts, and seven are elected at-large in a citywide vote. For the seven at-large seats, each political party may only nominate five candidates and voters may only vote for five. The result of this limited voting system is that at least two of the seven members elected will be from a different party than the other five. In practice, this has resulted in the at-large seats being filled by five Democrats and two Republicans. The ten district seats are usually held by Democrats, as well, with the exception of District 10, which covers the Far Northeast section of the city. The Democratic party's dominance in the city has resulted in a body with little turnover from year to year, although there have been periods of widespread retirements from City Council, such as during the ABSCAM scandal of the 1980s, or the DROP controversy on the early 2010s.

1952 – present

See also
List of members of Philadelphia City Council from 1920 to 1952

Notes

Sources

Government of Philadelphia

City council 1952